Varbla is a village in Lääneranna Parish in Pärnu County, in southwestern Estonia. It was the administrative centre of Varbla Parish. Varbla has a population of 133 (as of 1 January 2011).

Gallery

References

Villages in Pärnu County
Kreis Wiek